KRS One is the second solo studio album by American hip hop artist KRS-One. It was released on October 10, 1995 via Jive Records. Production was handled by DJ Premier, Diamond D, Big French Productions, Norty Cotto, Showbiz and KRS-One himself. It features guest appearances from Busta Rhymes, Channel Live, Das EFX, Dexter Thibou, Fat Joe and Mad Lion.

The album made it to number 19 on the Billboard 200 and number 2 on the Top R&B/Hip-Hop Albums in the United States. It also debuted at number 95 on the UK Albums Chart and number 13 on the UK R&B Albums Chart. Its lead single, "MC's Act Like They Don't Know", peaked at No. 57 on the US Billboard Hot 100 and No. 84 on the UK Singles Chart. It second single, "Rappaz R. N. Dainja", peaked at No. 47 in the UK.

Track listing

Sample credits
Track 1 contains a sample from "Time's Up" written by Omar Credle and Anthony Best as recorded by O.C.
Track 8 contains excerpts from "Pure" written by Ansar Bing, Askia Bing, Dwayne Burns, Keenan Edwards, Sean Nelson and Steven Samuel and performed by the Troubleneck Brothers
Track 9 contains a sample from "We Run Things (It's Like Dat)" written by Acklins Khaliyl Dillon, Harold Lee, Jamahl Hanna and Ali Shaheed Muhammad as recorded by Da Bush Babees
Track 13 contains a sample from "Mystique Blues" written by Wayne Henderson as recorded by The Crusaders

Personnel
Lawrence "KRS-One" Parker – main artist, producer (tracks: 4, 6, 7, 10, 12, 14), engineering (tracks: 7, 10, 14), mixing (tracks: 2, 4-7, 10, 12, 14)

Joseph "Fat Joe" Cartagena – featured artist (track 2)
Dexter Thibou – featured artist (track 5)
Vincent "Tuffy" Morgan – featured artist (track 6)
Hakim Green – featured artist (track 6)
Oswald "Mad Lion" Priest – featured artist (track 8)
Andre "Krazy Drayz" Weston – featured artist (track 9)
Willie "Skoob" Hines – featured artist (track 9)
Trevor "Busta Rhymes" Smith – featured artist (track 11)
Richard "Rich Nice" Jackson – backing vocals (track 10)
Derek "Sadat X" Murphy – backing vocals (track 13)
Rodney "DJ Dice" Battle – scratches (track 9)
Chris "DJ Premier" Martin – producer (tracks: 1, 3, 8), mixing (tracks: 1, 8)
Frenchie "Big French" Hunt – producer (track 2)
Norberto "Norty" Cotto – producer & mixing (track 5), engineering (tracks: 2, 3, 5, 12)
Rodney "Showbiz" LeMay – producer (track 9)
Joseph "Diamond D" Kirkland – producer & mixing (tracks: 11, 13)
"Commissioner" Gordon Williams – mixing (track 6), engineering (tracks: 6, 9, 11, 13), editing (tracks: 4, 10)
Eddie Sancho – engineering (tracks: 1, 8)
Won Allen – engineering (track 4)
Luis Tineo – engineering assistant (tracks: 1, 3, 5, 8, 12)
Roderick Goode – engineering assistant (tracks: 7, 10)
Tom Brick – mastering
Miguel Rivera – design
Daniel Hastings – photography
Scott "DJ Scott La Rock" Sterling – overseen by

Charts

Weekly charts

Year-end charts

Singles

References

External links

1995 albums
KRS-One albums
Jive Records albums
Albums produced by KRS-One
Albums produced by Diamond D
Albums produced by DJ Premier
Albums produced by Showbiz (producer)